Unión Deportiva Realejos is a football team based in Los Realejos, in the Canary Islands. Founded in 1943, it plays in the Preferente de Tenerife. Its stadium is Estadio Los Príncipes with a capacity of 3,000 seats.

Season to season

3 seasons in Segunda División B
21 seasons in Tercera División

External links
tenerifefutbol.com profile
resultados-futbol.com profile
Realejos Deportivo

Football clubs in the Canary Islands
Sport in Tenerife
Association football clubs established in 1943
Divisiones Regionales de Fútbol clubs
1943 establishments in Spain